Jonathan Rea  (born 2 February 1987) is a Northern Irish professional motorcycle racer. He competes in the Superbike World Championship and is a six-time champion in the series.

He is the first to have won the Superbike World Championship six times: in 2015, 2016, 2017, 2018, 2019 and 2020. He also owns the highest number of SBK race wins (107), fastest laps, podiums and total points (over 5,000 gained until the end of August 2021).

Previously he was runner-up in the Supersport World Championship for the Ten Kate Honda team in 2008, and runner-up in the British Superbike Championship in 2007 for the HM Plant Honda team. He was named Irish Motorcyclist of the Year in 2007, 2008, 2011 and 2016. Rea made two MotoGP starts in 2012, scoring points on both occasions, but has not been a regular rider in the championship.

He was nominated for the 2017 BBC Sports Personality of the Year Award, finishing in second place.

Career

Early career
For much of his career he has been backed by Red Bull. Rea was British 60cc motocross runner up in 1997, before moving up through the motocross classes. He was not originally keen to switch to circuit racing as he considered it to be boring, but he was persuaded to by friends Michael and Eugene Laverty, contesting the 2003 British 125cc Championship. His 2004 season was interrupted by a crash at Knockhill.

In 2005 Red Bull set up a British Superbike ride for him on a factory-spec Honda Fireblade. He showed his potential by snatching a pole position from the established names, and finished 16th in the series despite missing two races, at Snetterton after a heavy testing crash, and at Oulton Park after the death of a junior teammate in the previous event.

British Superbike Championship
He started the 2006 season strongly, lying sixth in the British Superbike Championship after five meetings. At Oulton Park he finished 3rd in race two, before being demoted to fourth as he was deemed to have gained a place from Shane Byrne on the last lap illegally, although he claimed that he crossed the infield grass as he was squeezed out of road. He qualified fifth at Mondello Park before heavy rain forced the cancellation of the races, and claimed that he had been on race tyres, rather than special soft qualifying compounds. He impressed at Mallory Park too, qualifying on the front row and running second until high-siding in race one, despite having no race engineer for the weekend. At Knockhill he took pole position, and followed a fourth in race one with his first career podium in race two, passing Leon Haslam for second with two laps to go. He ultimately took fourth in the championship, ahead of the factory Honda of Karl Harris.

He took Harris' factory ride for 2007, alongside reigning champion Ryuichi Kiyonari of Japan. After four-second places, he finally took his first win in the second race at Mondello Park, after dominating wet practice but struggling in the dry first race. A double victory at Knockhill followed, taking him to within nine points of Kiyonari at the top of the standings – retaining this position after Oulton Park in which each HM Plant Honda rider won once and crashed once. He ultimately finished as the series runner-up, 26 points behind Kiyonari and 20 ahead of Leon Haslam.

Also in 2007, he raced with Kiyonari and won a three-hour endurance race, and the pair was then entered for the Suzuka 8-Hour race on a factory Honda machine. Plans for him to contest the British MotoGP round on a Team Roberts bike were scrapped in favour of extra Suzuka preparation. He attended the 2007 World Superbike round at Brands Hatch, as he began to explore international options.

Supersport World Championship
In September 2007 he signed a three-year progressive deal with Ten Kate Honda to ride in the Supersport World Championship for the 2008 season, and the Superbike World Championship for the 2009 and 2010 seasons. He turned down the option of staying in British Superbikes with either HM Plant Honda or move to Rizla Suzuki, and turned down a World Superbike ride with the factory Xerox Ducati team. In his first race at Losail in Qatar, he crashed, badly injuring a finger. At Assen he challenged for a first WSS win, losing by 0.014 seconds to teammate Andrew Pitt. He did win for Ten Kate at the Donington Park British Supersport race, which the team entered as practice for the later WSS race there. His first World Supersport win came at Brno, and he immediately followed this with a second win at Brands Hatch, although the race was stopped early after the fatal accident of Craig Jones with seven laps remaining in the race. A third win followed at Vallelunga, pushing him back up to second in the standings behind Pitt. His chances of winning the title were ended by a wild move from Robbin Harms in the penultimate round at Magny-Cours. He did remount to finish tenth in the race.

Superbike World Championship

For 2009, Rea rode for the Hannspree Ten Kate Honda team in World Superbikes. He made the switch before the end of 2008, meaning that he made his WSBK debut in the final 2008 round at Portimão. His first podium came in the second race at round six at Kyalami. Another third place followed in the very next round at Miller Motorsport Park, before his first WSBK win came at Misano, after a frantic battle with the Ducati duo of Noriyuki Haga and Michel Fabrizio. This followed a chaotic first race that day; his bike failed on the dummy grid, he received a ride-through penalty for being given a lift back to the pits by Kiyonari on the warm-up lap, and when he switched to a wet set-up bike he – like teammate Carlos Checa – had trouble getting the second bike fired up. Rea missed several rounds in 2011 after sustained arm and collarbone injuries in a high-speed accident during warm-up for the Misano event. Rea missed the final four races of 2013 due to a broken femur.

He added a further win in Germany to finish fifth overall and second best rookie behind top rookie, Ben Spies, who won the World Superbike championship that year. He remained with Ten Kate for 2010, and scored a double victory at the team's home round at Assen, however this was followed by two crashes at Monza. A further crash in Superpole at Miller Motorsport Park injured his neck and shoulder, though he still raced the next day, scoring a 14th and an eighth. He scored only seven points at Misano, as he fell behind Carlos Checa in the battle for third place in the championship standings.

For the 2011 season, Rea stayed with the Ten Kate Racing family as its Honda-supported World Superbike team received backing from global lubricants manufacturer, Castrol, reviving the famous Castrol Honda name that saw World Superbike championship victories with John Kocinski in 1997 and Colin Edwards in 2000 and 2002.

After spending his entire career riding Honda machinery, Rea joined Kawasaki Racing Team as Tom Sykes' new teammate for the 2015 season. Rea dominated the season and won his maiden World Superbike title, with 14 wins.

For the 2016 season, Rea remains with Kawasaki.

Rea retained the title in 2016, 2017, 2018, 2019 and 2020
becoming the first man ever to win six successive superbike world championships.  On 9 June 2018, Rea won the first race at Brno to take his 60th career win and surpass the record of Carl Fogarty.

MotoGP World Championship
Rea made his MotoGP debut in 2012, replacing the injured Casey Stoner for the Repsol Honda team. He finished 8th in the San Marino race, held at Misano in Italy, and 7th at Motorland Aragon in Spain, before returning to World Superbike duties.

Personal life
Rea's family background lies in motorcycle road racing. His father, Johnny, competed at the Isle of Man TT and took his sole victory during the 1989 Junior TT race. His grandfather, John, sponsored Joey Dunlop.

Rea married Tatiana Weston, an Australian known as 'Tarsh' (whom he met when she worked promoting UK-based superbike team Honda Racing) at a 2012 ceremony in the Lake District.

Queen's University Belfast conferred an honorary doctorate on Rea during December 2019.

In 2021, Rea obtained his UK motorcycle licence for solo road machines by undertaking a course in his native Northern Ireland.

Rea was appointed Member of the Order of the British Empire (MBE) in the 2017 Birthday Honours and Officer of the Order of the British Empire (OBE) in the 2022 New Year Honours, both for services to motorcycle racing.

Career statistics

All-time statistics

British Superbike Championship

Races by year
(key) (Races in bold indicate pole position; races in italics indicate fastest lap)

Supersport World Championship

Races by year
(key) (Races in bold indicate pole position; races in italics indicate fastest lap)

Superbike World Championship

Races by year
(key) (Races in bold indicate pole position; races in italics indicate fastest lap)
{| class="wikitable" style="text-align:center; font-size:90%"
|-
!valign="middle" rowspan=2| Year
!valign="middle" rowspan=2| Bike
!colspan=2| 1
!colspan=2| 2
!colspan=2| 3
!colspan=2| 4
!colspan=2| 5
!colspan=2| 6
!colspan=2| 7
!colspan=2| 8
!colspan=2| 9
!colspan=2| 10
!colspan=2| 11
!colspan=2| 12
!colspan=2| 13
!colspan=2| 14
!rowspan=2| Pos
!rowspan=2| Pts
|-
! R1
! R2
! R1
! R2
! R1
! R2
! R1
! R2
! R1
! R2
! R1
! R2
! R1
! R2
! R1
! R2
! R1
! R2
! R1
! R2
! R1
! R2
! R1
! R2
! R1
! R2
! R1
! R2
|-
! 2008
!rowspan=7| Honda
| QAT
| QAT
| AUS
| AUS
| SPA
| SPA
| NED
| NED
| ITA
| ITA
| USA
| USA
| GER
| GER
| SMR
| SMR
| CZE
| CZE
| GBR
| GBR
| EUR
| EUR
| ITA
| ITA
| FRA
| FRA
|style="background:#dfffdf;"| POR4
|style="background:#dfffdf;"| POR15
! 26th
! 14
|-
! 2009
|style="background:#dfffdf;"| AUS5
|style="background:#dfffdf;"| AUS9
|style="background:#dfffdf;"| QAT12
|style="background:#dfffdf;"| QAT8
|style="background:#efcfff;"| SPARet
|style="background:#dfffdf;"| SPA13
|style="background:#dfffdf;"| NED7
|style="background:#dfffdf;"| NED5
|style="background:#dfffdf;"| ITA5
|style="background:#dfffdf;"| ITA4
|style="background:#dfffdf;"| RSA4
|style="background:#ffdf9f;"| RSA3
|style="background:#dfffdf;"| USA5
|style="background:#ffdf9f;"| USA3
|style="background:#dfffdf;"| SMR7
|style="background:#ffffbf;"| SMR1
|style="background:#dfffdf;"| GBR7
|style="background:#dfffdf;"| GBR15
|style="background:#ffdf9f;"| CZE3
|style="background:#dfffdf;"| CZE4
|style="background:#dfffdf;"| GER4
|style="background:#ffffbf;"| GER1
|style="background:#dfffdf;"| ITA7
|style="background:#dfffdf;"| ITA6
|style="background:#efcfff;"| FRARet
|style="background:#ffdf9f;"| FRA3
|style="background:#dfdfdf;"| POR2
|style="background:#ffdf9f;"| POR3
! 5th
! 315
|-
! 2010
|style="background:#dfffdf;"| AUS4
|style="background:#dfffdf;"| AUS6
|style="background:#ffdf9f;"| POR3
|style="background:#efcfff;"| PORRet
|style="background:#dfffdf;"| SPA6
|style="background:#dfffdf;"| SPA5
|style="background:#ffffbf;"| [[2010 Assen Superbike World Championship round|NED]]1
|style="background:#ffffbf;"| NED1
|style="background:#efcfff;"| ITARet
|style="background:#efcfff;"| ITA Ret
|style="background:#dfffdf;"| RSA5
|style="background:#dfdfdf;"| RSA2
|style="background:#dfffdf;"| USA14
|style="background:#dfffdf;"| USA8
|style="background:#dfffdf;"| SMR13
|style="background:#dfffdf;"| SMR12
|style="background:#ffffbf;"| CZE1
|style="background:#dfdfdf;"| CZE2
|style="background:#dfdfdf;"| GBR2
|style="background:#dfdfdf;"| GBR2
|style="background:#ffffbf;"| GER1
|style="background:#dfdfdf;"| GER2
|style="background:#FFFFFF;"| ITADNS
|style="background:#FFFFFF;"| ITADNS
|style="background:#dfffdf;"| FRA12
|style="background:#FFFFFF;"| FRADNS
|
|
! 4th
! 292
|-
! 2011
|style="background:#dfffdf;"| AUS12
|style="background:#dfffdf;"| AUS4
|style="background:#dfffdf;"| EUR5
|style="background:#dfffdf;"| EUR6
|style="background:#ffffbf;"| NED1
|style="background:#ffdf9f;"| NED3
|style="background:#dfffdf;"| ITA6
|style="background:#efcfff;"| ITARet
|style="background:#efcfff;"| USARet
|style="background:#dfffdf;"| USA11
|style="background:#FFFFFF;"| SMRDNS
|style="background:#FFFFFF;"| SMRDNS
| SPA
| SPA
| CZE
| CZE
| GBR
| GBR
|style="background:#dfffdf;"| GER10
|style="background:#dfffdf;"| GER4
|style="background:#ffffbf;"| ITA1
|style="background:#efcfff;"| ITARet
|style="background:#efcfff;"| FRARet
|style="background:#efcfff;"| FRARet
|style="background:#ffdf9f;"| POR3
|style="background:#ffdf9f;"| POR3
|
|
! 9th
! 170
|-
! 2012
|style="background:#dfffdf;"| AUS7
|style="background:#dfffdf;"| AUS4
|style="background:#dfffdf;"| ITA9
|style="background:#dfffdf;"| ITA5
|style="background:#efcfff;"| NEDRet
|style="background:#ffffbf;"| NED1
|style="background:#FFFFFF;"| ITAC
|style="background:#dfffdf;"| ITA6
|style="background:#dfffdf;"| EUR4
|style="background:#ffffbf;"| EUR1
|style="background:#dfffdf;"| USA4
|style="background:#dfdfdf;"| USA2
|style="background:#dfffdf;"| SMR5
|style="background:#dfdfdf;"| SMR2
|style="background:#CFCFFF;"| SPA16
|style="background:#dfffdf;"| SPA5
|style="background:#efcfff;"| CZERet
|style="background:#dfffdf;"| CZE12
|style="background:#dfffdf;"| GBR4
|style="background:#dfffdf;"| GBR9
|style="background:#efcfff;"| RUSRet
|style="background:#dfffdf;"| RUS7
|style="background:#efcfff;"| GERRet
|style="background:#dfffdf;"| GER4
|style="background:#dfffdf;"| POR6
|style="background:#dfdfdf;"| POR2
|style="background:#dfffdf;"| FRA13
|style="background:#dfdfdf;"| FRA2
! 5th
! 278.5
|-
! 2013
|style="background:#dfffdf;"| AUS8
|style="background:#dfffdf;"| AUS8
|style="background:#dfffdf;"| SPA4
|style="background:#dfffdf;"| SPA15
|style="background:#dfdfdf;"| NED2
|style="background:#dfffdf;"| NED4
|style="background:#dfffdf;"| ITA8
|style="background:#efcfff;"| ITARet
|style="background:#dfffdf;"| GBR4
|style="background:#dfffdf;"| GBR11
|style="background:#efcfff;"| PORRet
|style="background:#ffdf9f;"| POR3
|style="background:#efcfff;"| ITARet
|style="background:#dfdfdf;"| ITA2
|style="background:#dfffdf;"| RUS4
|style="background:#FFFFFF;"| RUSC
|style="background:#ffffbf;"| GBR1
|style="background:#dfffdf;"| GBR4
|style="background:#efcfff;"| GERRet
|style="background:#FFFFFF;"| GERDNS
| TUR
| TUR
| USA
| USA
| FRA
| FRA
| SPA
| SPA
! 9th
! 176
|-
! 2014
|style="background:#dfffdf;"| AUS6
|style="background:#dfffdf;"| AUS5
|style="background:#ffdf9f;"| SPA3
|style="background:#dfffdf;"| SPA5
|style="background:#ffdf9f;"| NED3
|style="background:#ffffbf;"| NED1
|style="background:#ffffbf;"| ITA1
|style="background:#ffffbf;"| ITA1
|style="background:#dfffdf;"| GBR6
|style="background:#dfffdf;"| GBR6
|style="background:#dfffdf;"| MAL6
|style="background:#dfffdf;"| MAL6
|style="background:#dfffdf;"| SMR7
|style="background:#dfffdf;"| SMR5
|style="background:#dfffdf;"| POR5
|style="background:#ffffbf;"| POR1
|style="background:#dfffdf;"| USA6
|style="background:#ffdf9f;"| USA3
|style="background:#dfffdf;"|  SPA4
|style="background:#dfffdf;"|  SPA5
|style="background:#ffdf9f;"| FRA3
|style="background:#efcfff;"| FRARet
|style="background:#dfffdf;"| QAT4
|style="background:#dfdfdf;"| QAT2
| 
| 
|
|
!style="background:#ffdf9f;"| 3rd
!style="background:#ffdf9f;"| 334
|-
! 2015
!rowspan=6| Kawasaki
|style="background:#ffffbf;"| AUS1
|style="background:#dfdfdf;"| AUS2
|style="background:#ffffbf;"| THA1
|style="background:#ffffbf;"| THA1
|style="background:#ffffbf;"| SPA1
|style="background:#dfdfdf;"| SPA2
|style="background:#ffffbf;"| NED1
|style="background:#ffffbf;"| NED1
|style="background:#ffffbf;"| ITA1
|style="background:#ffffbf;"| ITA1
|style="background:#dfdfdf;"| GBR2
|style="background:#dfdfdf;"| GBR2
|style="background:#ffffbf;"| POR1
|style="background:#ffffbf;"| POR1
|style="background:#dfdfdf;"| SMR2
|style="background:#ffffbf;"| SMR1
|style="background:#ffdf9f;"| USA3
|style="background:#ffdf9f;"| USA3
|style="background:#ffffbf;"| MAL1
|style="background:#dfdfdf;"| MAL2
|style="background:#dfffdf;"| SPA4
|style="background:#dfffdf;"| SPA4
|style="background:#ffffbf;"| FRA1
|style="background:#ffffbf;"| FRA1
|style="background:#dfdfdf;"| QAT2
|style="background:#EFCFFF;"| QATRet
|
|
!style="background:#ffffbf;"| 1st
!style="background:#ffffbf;"| 548
|-
! 2016
|style="background:#ffffbf;"| AUS1
|style="background:#ffffbf;"| AUS1
|style="background:#ffffbf;"| THA1
|style="background:#dfdfdf;"| THA2
|style="background:#dfdfdf;"| SPA2
|style="background:#ffdf9f;"| SPA3
|style="background:#ffffbf;"| NED1
|style="background:#ffffbf;"| NED1
|style="background:#dfdfdf;"| ITA2
|style="background:#dfdfdf;"| ITA2
|style="background:#dfdfdf;"| MAL2
|style="background:#ffdf9f;"| MAL3
|style="background:#ffdf9f;"| GBR3
|style="background:#dfdfdf;"| GBR2
|style="background:#ffffbf;"| ITA1
|style="background:#ffffbf;"| ITA1
|style="background:#ffffbf;"| USA1
|style="background:#efcfff;"| USARet
|style="background:#efcfff;"| GERRet
|style="background:#ffffbf;"| GER1
|style="background:#dfffdf;"| FRA4
|style="background:#dfdfdf;"| FRA2
|style="background:#ffdf9f;"| SPA3
|style="background:#dfdfdf;"| SPA2
|style="background:#dfdfdf;"| QAT2
|style="background:#ffdf9f;"| QAT3
|
|
!style="background:#ffffbf;"| 1st
!style="background:#ffffbf;"| 498
|-
! 
|style="background:#ffffbf;"| AUS1
|style="background:#ffffbf;"| AUS1
|style="background:#ffffbf;"| THA1
|style="background:#ffffbf;"| THA1
|style="background:#ffffbf;"| ARA1
|style="background:#dfdfdf;"| ARA2
|style="background:#ffffbf;"| NED1
|style="background:#ffffbf;"| NED1
|style="background:#dfdfdf;"| ITA2
|style="background:#dfdfdf;"| ITA2
|style="background:#efcfff;"| GBRRet
|style="background:#ffffbf;"| GBR1
|style="background:#ffdf9f;"| ITA3
|style="background:#dfdfdf;"| ITA2
|style="background:#dfdfdf;"| USA2
|style="background:#ffffbf;"| USA1
|style="background:#dfdfdf;"| GER2
|style="background:#dfdfdf;"| GER2
|style="background:#ffffbf;"| POR1
|style="background:#ffffbf;"| POR1
|style="background:#ffffbf;"| FRA1
|style="background:#efcfff;"| FRARet
|style="background:#ffffbf;"| SPA1
|style="background:#ffffbf;"| SPA1
|style="background:#ffffbf;"| QAT1
|style="background:#ffffbf;"| QAT1
|
|
!style="background:#ffffbf;"| 1st
!style="background:#ffffbf;"| 556
|-
! 
|style="background:#dfffdf;"| AUS5
|style="background:#dfdfdf;"| AUS2
|style="background:#ffffbf;"| THA1
|style="background:#dfffdf;"| THA4
|style="background:#ffffbf;"| ARA1
|style="background:#dfdfdf;"| ARA2
|style="background:#ffffbf;"| NED1
|style="background:#dfdfdf;"| NED2
|style="background:#ffffbf;"| ITA1
|style="background:#ffffbf;"| ITA1
|style="background:#dfdfdf;"| GBR2
|style="background:#ffdf9f;"| GBR3
|style="background:#ffffbf;"| CZE1
|style="background:#efcfff;"| CZERet
|style="background:#ffffbf;"| USA1
|style="background:#ffffbf;"| USA1
|style="background:#ffffbf;"| ITA1
|style="background:#ffffbf;"| ITA1
|style="background:#ffffbf;"| POR1
|style="background:#ffffbf;"| POR1
|style="background:#ffffbf;"| FRA1
|style="background:#ffffbf;"| FRA1
|style="background:#ffffbf;"| ARG1
|style="background:#ffffbf;"| ARG1
|style="background:#ffffbf;"| QAT 1
|style="background:#;"| QATC
|
|
!style="background:#ffffbf;"| 1st
!style="background:#ffffbf;"| 545
|}

* Season still in progress.

Grand Prix motorcycle racing

By season

By class

Races by year
(key) (Races in bold' indicate pole position; races in italics'' indicate fastest lap)

Suzuka 8 Hours results

References

External links

1987 births
Living people
British motorcycle racers
Motorcycle racers from Northern Ireland
British Supersport Championship riders
British Superbike Championship riders
Superbike World Championship riders
Supersport World Championship riders
People from Ballyclare
People educated at Larne Grammar School
Repsol Honda MotoGP riders
Officers of the Order of the British Empire
MotoGP World Championship riders
Alumni of Queen's University Belfast